Jesús Parejo (born 10 March 1981) is a Venezuelan former track and field athlete who competes in the shot put and discus throw. His greatest achievements were a discus silver medal at the 2010 Central American and Caribbean Games and bronze medals at the 2011 South American Championships in Athletics and 2008 Central American and Caribbean Championships in Athletics.

He also represented his country at the 2011 Pan American Games, 2011 Military World Games, and the 2014 South American Games, and was a three-time participant at the Ibero-American Championships in Athletics. He was a medallist at three straight editions of both the Bolivarian Games and ALBA Games.

A five-time national champion, he was Venezuela's top discus thrower from around 2005 to 2014, following on from Héctor Hurtado.

Personal bests
Shot put –  (2011)
Discus throw –  (2008)
Hammer throw –  (2005)

All information from All-Athletics profile.

International competitions

References

External links

Living people
1981 births
Venezuelan shot putters
Venezuelan discus throwers
Pan American Games competitors for Venezuela
Athletes (track and field) at the 2011 Pan American Games
Central American and Caribbean Games silver medalists for Venezuela
Competitors at the 2010 Central American and Caribbean Games
Central American and Caribbean Games medalists in athletics